Adolf Carl Josef Krazer (15 April 1858, in Zusmarshausen – 7 August 1926, in Karlsruhe) was a German mathematician.

Publications

References

19th-century German mathematicians
20th-century German mathematicians
People from Augsburg (district)
1858 births
1926 deaths